Philadelphia Club was founded in 1834 and is located at 13th and Walnut Streets in Center City, Philadelphia. It is the oldest city club in the United States and one of the oldest gentlemen's clubs. Notable members have included George Meade, Owen Wister, and many members of the Du Pont and Biddle families.

History

Founding
The club's founders were a group of men who met to play cards at Mrs. Rubicam's Coffeehouse at the northwest corner of 5th & Minor Streets in Philadelphia. In early 1834, they moved around the corner to the Adelphia Building at 212 South 5th Street, taking the new building's name as the club's name. The Adelphia Club held its first recorded meeting on March 21, 1834. The following year, its members moved to the Joseph Bonaparte house at 260 South 9th Street, and changed the club's name to The Philadelphia Club. In 1843 they moved to 919 Walnut Street, and in 1850 the club moved to its current location, the Thomas Butler Mansion at 1301 Walnut Street. Frederick J. Benton the great-grandson of Joseph Bonaparte, was the owner of the nightspot in the 1930s early 1940s.

American Civil War
Union Army General George Meade was admitted to club membership only after winning the Battle of Gettysburg.

Presidents Day
Following Proclamation 87 - Celebration of George Washington's Birthday made by President Abraham Lincoln on February 19, 1862, Philadelphia celebrated the Birthday of President George Washington with a military parade procession on Broad, Walnut and Chestnut Streets. The parade occurred on February 22, 1862 and was led by Major General Robert Patterson. The Club celebrated this occasion with a tribute President Washington. Philadelphia artist Joseph Boggs Beale recorded the Club's tribute in his diary: The club house, 13th & Walnut, was illuminated with candles at every pane of glass, & had a beautiful American flag hanging so that the light on it showed it several squares away. In one of their windows they had a pure white marble head of Washington & the American flag (silk) covering the pedestal & this was set off with a dark red background and brilliantly lighted from above.

Prohibition
In 1931, during Prohibition, the Philadelphia Club was raided by members of the Philadelphia Police Department, led by Bronislaw Wielbaba, in an effort to seize illegal spirits and wine. According to Weilbaba's testimony, the police captured 401 quarts, 118 pints, and a 1-gallon jug of alcohol during the raid of member lockers on February 2, 1931. The only arrest made was of the club manager.

Clubhouse

Design of the Butler Mansion is attributed to William Strickland and was one of his few residential commissions. It was built as a city house for Thomas Butler, only son of South Carolina U.S. Senator Pierce Butler. Thomas Butler died before the building's 1838 completion, and it stood vacant until its 1849 purchase by The Philadelphia Club. The club added a billiard room, moved the kitchen to the basement, and opened its new clubhouse in 1850. It was altered in 1888-89 by Frank Furness, who designed a rear addition and expanded its kitchens and main dining room. Wilson Eyre renovated its interiors a decade later, and additional alterations were done by Horace Trumbauer in 1905 and 1908, and by Mellor, Meigs & Howe in 1916.

George C. Boldt, hired in 1876 as a dishwasher, rose to become the club's steward and married the former steward's daughter. With financial backing from club members, he built the Bellevue Hotel in Philadelphia; he later built the Bellevue Stratford Hotel, also in Philadelphia, and he managed the Waldorf Astoria Hotel in New York City.

Jimmy Duffy, a Philadelphia Main Line caterer, was the club's bartender from 1895 to 1929.

In addition to card rooms, dining rooms, smoking rooms, and a bar, the Club contains a library, a large collection of Philadelphia prints, a collection of game trophy heads donated by Theodore Roosevelt Jr. and lodging rooms on its upper stories.

Food
The Philadelphia Club features Veal and Ham Pie whose ancestor may be the "Travellers Pie," once a famous dish at London's Travellers Club that features bacon and pork as well as veal and ham.

Presidents and guests
Among the club's presidents have been Captain James Biddle, George H. Boker, Adolph E. Borie, General George Cadwalader, Mayor Richard Vaux, and Owen Wister, who wrote its 1934 centennial history.

Among the club's guests have been twelve U.S. presidents: John Quincy Adams, Martin Van Buren, James K. Polk, Franklin Pierce, James Buchanan, Ulysses S. Grant, Theodore Roosevelt, William Howard Taft, William McKinley, Franklin D. Roosevelt, Gerald R. Ford, and George H. W. Bush; soldiers and sailors George B. McClellan, William Tecumseh Sherman, William F. "Buffalo Bill" Cody, George Dewey, George Goethals and Jack Keane; writers, artists, actors and musicians: William Makepeace Thackeray, Henry Wadsworth Longfellow, Henry Irving, Charles Kemble, Edwin Booth, Booth Tarkington, John Barrymore, Joseph Pennell, Leopold Stokowski, Douglas Fairbanks, Jr., Bram Stoker, Eugene Ormandy, Louis Kahn and Roger Scruton; and other public men Talleyrand, Stephen A. Douglas, Lord Randolph Churchill, Grand Duke Alexander, Oliver Wendell Holmes, Duarte Pio, Henry Cabot Lodge, Winston Churchill, Lord Louis Mountbatten, and Henry Clay.

In its first 119 years, women were admitted to the club on only three occasions: balls in January 1851 and January 1869 and the centennial reception in October 1934. In May 1953 the membership voted to allow women guests at dinners. Many restrictions have since been eased, but women remain excluded from membership.  In the mid 1970s, the club hired a woman barber, Isabella Judith Devaney, who worked there for 18 years before leaving due to health problems.

Status as the "oldest club"
The Philadelphia Club is the oldest gentlemen's club in the United States. Three social clubs for men are older, but none of them offers the facilities of a traditional gentlemen's clubregular hours, paid staff, a bar, a dining room, lodging roomsthat are associated with the English model of city clubs in the St. James's district of London.

The three older social clubs are:
The South River Club in South River, Maryland, a fishing club that meets four times a year, was founded .
The Schuylkill Fishing Company in Andalusia, Pennsylvania, which meets informally at the Philadelphia Club during winter months, was founded in 1732.
The Old Colony Club in Plymouth, Massachusetts, which meets on Friday nights and special occasions, was founded in 1769.

Notable members

William Wallace Atterbury
Edward Fitzgerald Beale
Edward Julius Berwind
Anthony Joseph Drexel Biddle
Anthony Joseph Drexel Biddle, Jr.
Francis Beverly Biddle
James Biddle
Livingston L. Biddle, Jr.
Curtis Bok
George Henry Boker
Adolph E. Borie
George Cadwalader
John Cadwalader, Jr.
Alexander J. Cassatt
George William Childs
William Thaddeus Coleman Jr. 
Fitz Eugene Dixon Jr.
Anthony J. Drexel
Franklin D'Olier
Henry Francis du Pont
Wilson Eyre
Edwin H. Fitler
Thomas Sovereign Gates
Thomas S. Gates, Jr.
Charles Gilpin
Robert Goelet
T. Truxtun Hare
Howard Henry
George Howe
John G. Johnson
Gerry Lenfest 
William Draper Lewis
James McCrea
Robert L. McNeil Jr.
George Meade
Boies Penrose
Spencer Penrose
Eli Kirk Price II
Samuel Rea
William T. Read
George M. Robeson
Theodore Roosevelt, Jr.
Joseph George Rosengarten
Robert Montgomery Scott
Thomas A. Scott
Frank Thomson
Charlemagne Tower, Jr.
Richard Vaux
Ethelbert Watts
Piers Wedgwood, 4th Baron Wedgwood
Francis Wharton
George D. Widener, Jr.
Isaac J. Wistar
Langhorne Wister
Owen Wister
Clarence C. Zantzinger

Critical assessment
In an April 2008 article from the gossip publication, Philadelphia Magazine described the club:

See also
 List of traditional gentlemen's clubs in the United States
 Old Philadelphians

References
Notes

Bibliography
 Bell, Malcolm, Jr. "Major Butler's Legacy." (Athens: University of Georgia Press, 1987)
 Freedman, Paul. (2017-04-07) "The Fascinating History of Food at Private Clubs."  
 Klaus, William R. "This Old House." ( privately printed, 1999).
 Lippincott, Horace Mather. "The Philadelphia Club," Early Philadelphia: Its People, Life and Progress (Philadelphia: J.B. Lippincott Company, 1917), pp. 300–02.
 Rivinus, F. Markoe. The Philadelphia Club, 1934-1984 (privately printed, 1984).
 Wister, Owen. The Philadelphia Club, 1834-1934 (privately printed, 1934).
 Wainwright, Nicholas B. "Education of an Artist: The Diary of Joseph Boggs Beale."

External links

The Philadelphia Club from Bryn Mawr College.
The Philadelphia Club from wikimapia.

 
Buildings and structures in Philadelphia
Organizations based in Philadelphia
Organizations established in 1834
Gentlemen's clubs in the United States
History of Philadelphia
1834 establishments in Pennsylvania
Philadelphia Register of Historic Places
Clubs and societies in Philadelphia